Fowler’s Buildings is an office building and warehouse located at 3–9 Victoria Street and 1–3 Temple Lane. Liverpool, England.  They were constructed in two phases between 1865 and 1869, for the Fowler brothers, who were produce dealers, and were designed by the local architect J. A. Picton.  The whole structure is recorded in the National Heritage List for England as a designated Grade II* listed building.

The style of the Victoria Street frontage is freely adapted from Italian Renaissance architecture.  It has three storeys and a basement, and is in nine bays. The basement is rusticated.   Along the exterior of the principal floor are eight polished granite Tuscan columns.  The floor above this has windows with "curvy" surrounds, which are almost Baroque in style.  Along the top floor are round-headed windows. At the summit of the building is a cornice, and a segmental pediment surmounted by an urn.  The warehouse extends behind the offices along Temple Lane, and is constructed in polychromic brick.  It is in five storeys with a basement, and has 14 bays.

See also

 Grade II* listed buildings in Merseyside
 Architecture of Liverpool

References

Grade II* listed buildings in Liverpool
Commercial buildings completed in 1869
1869 establishments in England